The 1958 NAIA football season was the third season of college football sponsored by the National Association of Intercollegiate Athletics. For the first time in U.S. college football history, multi-game playoffs were held to determine a championship. In 1956 and 1957, the Holiday Bowl opponents had previously been determined by an invitation extended to two teams. For 1958, four teams were in a playoff. Both semifinal games were played on December 6, 1958, with Arizona State College hosting Minnesota's Gustavus Adolphus College in Flagstaff, Arizona and Northeastern Oklahoma State hosting St. Benedict's College (of Kansas) in Tulsa, Oklahoma.  Arizona State won 41 to 12  and Northeastern won, 19-14.

The season was played from August to December 1958, culminating in the third annual NAIA Football National Championship, played this year again at Stewart Field in St. Petersburg, Florida. During its four years in St. Petersburg, the game was called the Holiday Bowl.

Northeastern State defeated Arizona State–Flagstaff on December 28, 1958 in the championship game, 19–13, to win their first NAIA national title.

Conference standings

Postseason

See also
 1958 NCAA University Division football season
 1958 NCAA College Division football season

References

 
NAIA Football National Championship